The following is a list of rivers in Switzerland:

Rivers by length
(> 100 km, only the length in Switzerland)
Rhine - 375 km - 36,494 km2
Aare (or Aar) - 295 km - 17,779 km2
Rhône - 264 km - 10,403 km2
Reuss - 158 km - 3,425 km2
Linth and Limmat together - 140 km - 2,416 km2
Saane/La Sarine - 128 km - 1,892 km2
Thur - 125 km

Rivers by drainage area

(> 1000 km2, only the area in Switzerland)
Rhine - 375 km - 36,494 km2
Aare - 295 km - 17,779 km2
Rhône - 264 km - 10,403 km2
Reuss - 158 km - 3,425 km2
Linth / Limmat - 140 km - 2,416 km2
Inn - 104 km - 2,150 km2
Saane/La Sarine - 128 km - 1,892 km2
Thur  - 125 km - 1,724 km2
Ticino - 91 km - 1,616 km2
Hinterrhein - 57.3 km - 1,693 km2
Vorderrhein - 67.5 km - 1,514 km2
Doubs - 74 km - 1,310 km2
Kander - 44 km - 1,126 km2

Rivers by orography

Switzerland is drained into four directions: 
North Sea, via the Rhine.
Mediterranean Sea, via the Rhône.
Adriatic Sea, via the Po and the Adige.
Black Sea, via the Danube.

Rivers that flow into other rivers are sorted by the proximity of their points of confluence to the sea (the lower in the list, the more upstream). Some rivers (e.g. Danube) do not flow through Switzerland themselves, but they are mentioned for having Swiss tributaries. They are given in italics.

Rhine  (main branch in Hook of Holland, Netherlands)
High Rhine - 375 km - 36,494 km2
Wiese - km - km2 (in Basel)
Birsig 21 km - 82 km2 (in Basel)
Birs - 73 km - 924 km2 (in Basel)  
Aare - 295 km - 17,779 km2 (in Koblenz)
Linth / Limmat - 140 km - 2,416 km2 (in Brugg)
Sihl - 73 km - 341 km2 (in Zürich)
Reuss - 158 km - 3,425 km2 (in Brugg)
Kleine Emme - 58 km - 477 km2 (near Luzern)
Emme - 80 km - 983 km2 (in Solothurn)
Orbe / Thielle - 57 km - 488 km2 (into Lake Biel in La Neuveville)
Broye - 86 km - 850 km2 (into Lake Neuchâtel in La Sauge)
Saane/La Sarine - 128 km - 1,892 km2 (near Bern)
Kander - 44 km - 1,126 km2 (into Lake Thun near Thun)
Simme - 53 km - 594 km2 (in Wimmis)
Lütschine - km - (into Lake Brienz near Interlaken)
Glatt - 67 km - 416 km2 
Töss - 58 km - 442 km2 (in Teufen)
Thur - 125 km - 1724 km2 (near Flaach)
Lake Constance; Alpine Rhine - 170 km 
Landquart - 43 km - 618 km2 (in Landquart)
Plessur - 33 km - 267 km2
Hinterrhein - 57.3 km - 1,693 km2 (at Reichenau)
Albula - 36 km - 950 km2 (near Thusis)
Gelgia - km - km2 (in Tiefencastel)
Landwasser - 30.5 km
Vorderrhein - 67.5 km - 1,514 km2 (at Reichenau, near Chur)
Rabiusa - 32 km
Valser Rhine - 30 km - 186 km2
Rein da Curnera - 7 km - 27 km2
Rein da Medel - 25 km - 128 km2
(see sources of the Rhine)

Rhône - 264 km - 10,403 km2 (in Port-Saint-Louis-du-Rhône, France)
Saône - km - km2 (in Lyon, France)
Doubs - 74 km - 1,310 km2 (in Verdun-sur-le-Doubs, France)
Allaine - 28 km - 197 km2 (near Montbéliard, France)
Arve - km - km2 (in Geneva)
Drance - 43 km - 678 km2 (in Martigny)
Lonza - km - km2 (in Gampel)
Vispa - 40 km - 787 km2 (in Visp)

Po (near Venice, Italy)
Adda - km - km2 (in Cremona, Italy)
Breggia - km - km2 (into Lake Como, between Cernobbio and Como, Italy)
Mera - km - km2 (into Lake Como in Sorico, Italy)
Poschiavino - km - km2 (in Tirano, Italy)
Ticino - 91 km - 1,616 km2 (in Pavia, Italy)
Toce - km - km2 (into Lake Maggiore in Verbania, Italy)
Diveria - km - m2 (near Domodossola, Italy)
Tresa - 13 km - 754 km2 (into Lake Maggiore in Luino, Italy)
Maggia - 55 km - 926 km2 (into Lake Maggiore in Locarno)

Adige (near Venice, Italy)
Rom - km - km2 (in Glurns, Italy)

Danube (in Sulina, Romania)
Inn - 104 km - 2,150 km2 (in Passau, Germany)

See also
Hydrology of Switzerland
Geography of Switzerland
Rivers of Europe
Valleys of the Alps
List of islands of Switzerland
List of lakes of Switzerland
:Category:Rivers of Switzerland

References

External links

Hydrological data of some Swiss rivers
Daily forecast of Swiss rivers

Switzerland
Rivers